Running to the Sky is a 2019 Kyrgyzstani drama film directed by Mirlan Abdykalykov. It was selected as the Kyrgyz entry for the Best International Feature Film at the 93rd Academy Awards, but it was not nominated.

Synopsis
A schoolboy gets a chance of bigger opportunities after displaying a talent for running.

Cast
 Temirlan Asankadyrov as Jekshen
 Ruslan Orozakunov as Saparbek
 Meerim Atantaeva as Gym teacher
 Ilim Kalmuratov as Math teacher

See also
 List of submissions to the 93rd Academy Awards for Best International Feature Film
 List of Kyrgyz submissions for the Academy Award for Best International Feature Film

References

External links
 

2019 films
2019 drama films
Kyrgyzstani drama films
Kyrgyz-language films